Bexar County Learning Center is a secondary alternative school located in San Antonio, Texas, in the East Central Independent School District. The campus serves youth at the Cyndi Taylor Krier Center from across Bexar County. In 2019, the campus was recognized by Georgetown University for their Capstone Project to improve educational outcomes for students at the Krier Center. Former principal Dr. Dustin Breithaupt left the campus to join Lytle ISD as assistant superintendent.

References

External links
Official Website

Public high schools in Bexar County, Texas
Alternative schools in the United States